Milwaukee Lake is a natural lake in South Dakota, in the United States that is also near the town of Wentworth.

Milwaukee Lake was named after Milwaukee, Wisconsin, the native home of a large share of the first settlers.

See also
List of lakes in South Dakota

References

Lakes of South Dakota
Lakes of Lake County, South Dakota